Mount Beowulf is a peak rising to about  at the southeast side of Mime Glacier in the Asgard Range, Victoria Land. It stands at the head of Beowulf Glacier, which was named in association with the mountain. It was mapped by the United States Geological Survey (USGS) in 1962 from U.S. Navy aerial photographs taken between 1947 and 1959. It was named by the New Zealand Antarctic Place-Names Committee (NZ-APC) in 1983 for Beowulf, the hero of the Old English epic poem.

Mountains of the Asgard Range
McMurdo Dry Valleys